Holy Shit is an American rock band formed in Los Angeles in the early 2000s. Originally a duo consisting of Matt Fishbeck and Ariel Pink, it has evolved to be essentially a Fishbeck solo project. They have released only two LPs: Stranded at Two Harbors (2006) and Solid Rain (2017).

Discography
Studio albums
 Stranded at Two Harbors (2006)
 Solid Rain (2017)

References

External links
 

Musical groups established in the 2000s
Ariel Pink
Rock music groups from California
Musical groups from Los Angeles